The chronophotographic gun is one of the ancestors of the movie camera. It was invented in 1882 by Étienne-Jules Marey, a French scientist and chronophotographer. It could shoot 12 images per second and it was the first invention to capture moving images on the same chronomatographic plate using a metal shutter.

History 
Étienne-Jules Marey invented it in 1882, based on the photo revolver invented in 1874 by the French astronomer Jules Janssen. Janssen invented it because he wanted to study the different phases of the sun and the movements of Venus. Marey, on the other hand, wanted to study how animals, insects and birds moved. He tried to use the chronophotographic gun to study bigger animals like horses or people, but the images superimposed on the film. Due to the slowness of the bigger animals there was no time between photo and photo for the subject to move sufficiently from the last position and it appeared all together and superimposed.

Functioning 
The functioning of the chronophotographic gun is very similar to a normal rifle, with grip, canon and rotating drum, except that it does not carry bullets but photographic plates with which it caught the light at high speed. It worked like this: the hammer was made back to the end, which allowed the drum to move where there were the photographic plates. There was also a shutter on the drum, which prevented the light to enter when it was not taking a photo; and in the canon there was a lens. If one wanted to change the approach, the length of the canon had to be changed.

Use 
Marey was a doctor and he was interested in the body movement, which was not much well studied at the time. With the chronophotographic gun, he pointed to the action he was interested to investigate and he only shot once and got 12 images per second. The machine, thanks to the circular movement of the drum animated by clockwork mechanisms, could reach a shutter speed of 1/700 seconds. This speed was caused by the discovery of new chemical substances, which were increasingly sensible to light. Then, when the images were revealed, they were printed on a previously prepared glass with a gelatinous dissolution of silver bromide and they ended up all together on the same photograph. In this way, he had a sequence of images in which the movement he wanted to study was portrayed, showing the details never seen before of the movement of the persons and animals. He called this method of making photographs chronophotography.

One of the main problems of this invention was that the different photos could not be made from the same point of view, since the user remained still while what he wanted to photograph moved very quickly. To solve this problem, the chronophotograph was invented; it had the same characteristics as the chronophotographic gun but had rails which allowed it to make a lateral displacement. This way an equal point of view was obtained in all the photographs.

Among the different things he studied there are: the flight of birds, the jump of a man, how cats fall from four legs, etc.

Another method to create chronophotographic sequences had been developed by Eadweard Muybridge and Leland Stanford in 1878. They used 12 cameras in a line to register all phases of different horse gaits (expanded to 24 cameras and to other animal and human movements in the next year). Initial results were published as The Horse in Motion and  received much international attention. Marey expressed interest in help from Muybridge to record the flight of birds in La Nature, but reverted to experiments with a photographic gun after Muybridge's pictures of birds didn't satisfy his needs.

Fall in disuse 
With time and improvements in his investigations and inventions, Marey ended up changing the chronophotographic gun for a chronophotograph camera. This one had a fixed plate and a shutter with which the time could be controlled. He replaced the glass plate with a photosensive paper that moved independently inside the camera thanks to an electromagnet. Finally, he ended up replacing the paper by the negative so he could obtain infinite copies of its work.

Applications and posterior influences 
The chronophotographic gun was an invention that fully contributed to the studies of the synthesis of the movement but which was also a step forward in the development and creation of other inventions, movements and machines. To begin with, the biggest influence the chronophotographic gun exerted on was the creation of the Lumière brothers’ cinematographer, since it managed to synthesize the movement into 12 exhibitions per second. So Marey created an important antecedent to the capture system of the light and the movement that the cinematographer would have.

The chronophotographic gun is also considered as an antecedent of a machine gun used during the world war one called “Mark III Hythe machine gun camera”. This weapon was used by the British air forces to train their shooters in the air combat. One of the reasons for its use was that the 120mm film was much cheaper than the ammunition needed; but the main reason is that the resulting photographs could allow the evaluators to see how careful and precise the pilot was during the simulation combat. So, the photo capture system of the chronophotographic gun became a precursor of a military training tool.

In the artistic field, the works resulting from the chronophotographic gun are considered influential in the avant-garde movement called Futurism, because this movement is based on the search for the capture of the movement. Futurism, in the context of the formal experimentation of the avant-gardes of the early 20th century, had as an ideal the rejection of the traditional aesthetics and the interest in the contemporary life, innovation and the latest technologies. The dominant subjects were the machine and the movement. To represent this movement, they repeated the same image as if it were a filmic sequence, which they called simultaneism. This reminds of the sequences of images of the same animal or person moving that Marey did in his studies.

In the words of Jonathan Miller: “Étienne Jules Marey was a qualified doctor and there would have been no Italian futurism movement without his extraordinary influence”.

References 

History of photography
Cameras